Okay is a Turkish masculine given name and surname. Notable people with the name include:

Given name
 Okay Arpa (born 1977), Turkish karateka
 Okay Gönensin (1950–2017), Turkish journalist
 Okay Temiz (born 1939), Turkish jazz musician
 Okay Yokuşlu (born 1994), Turkish footballer

Surname
 Meral Okay (1959–2012), Turkish actress
 Yaman Okay (1951–1993), Turkish actor

Turkish-language surnames
Turkish masculine given names